Samuel French, Inc. is an American company, founded by Samuel French and Thomas Hailes Lacy, who formed a partnership to combine their existing interests in London and New York City. It publishes plays, represents authors, and sells scripts from their Los Angeles, UK, and online bookstores.

The firm has offices in New York City; London; and Hollywood, California.  An office in Toronto, Canada, closed in 2007.

The company's London subsidiary, Samuel French Ltd., publishes stage plays for the UK market, mostly acting editions, serves as licensing agent for performance rights, and runs a theatrical bookshop on its premises at Fitzrovia in central London, England.

In December 2018, Concord Music acquired Samuel French to form Concord Theatricals.

History

Samuel French was born in Massachusetts shortly after the turn of the 19th century and began publishing French’s American Drama in the mid-1800s in New York. It soon became the most widely distributed catalogue of dramatic prose in the US. French soon acquired a London dramatic publishing company founded by Thomas Hailes Lacy, and continued to expand his business on both sides of the Atlantic – Samuel French managing the London business while his son, Thomas Henry, took control of the New York operations.

In the late 1800s, Samuel French began publishing contemporary American dramas, and helped the amateur theatre movement by making more plays available to Little Theatres – a rewarding concept that had never before been done in the industry. By the turn of the century, amateur interest in acting had increased enormously. As the quality and quantity of available plays improved, so the number of amateur groups increased. The seeds of the Little Theatre movement were sown. By the time of World War I, such groups along with the high school societies were the firm’s best customers. Although father and son had long since died, the New York and London entities continued under the capable hands of their managing partners.

From the mid-1940s to the early 1990s, the company witnessed significant growth in its catalogue and business. During this time, stock companies, including the League of Resident Theatres, were flourishing; so too were the Little Theatres, and the development of the dinner theater, which was proving increasingly popular. Since the mid-1990s, the Samuel French catalogue has grown substantially with a focus on emerging playwrights carefully balanced by additional acquisitions of the most prominent American and British playwrights such as Neil Simon, Tom Stoppard, Edward Albee, August Wilson and David Mamet.

Breaking Character
Samuel French publishes an online magazine entitled Breaking Character. On the site, staff members and guest authors contribute to writing various articles related to the world of theatre. Topics include new publications, title spotlights, musical moments, staff picks, and playwright profiles. The magazine allows for interaction with the public.

Off-Off-Broadway Short Play Festival

Samuel French's annual Off-Off-Broadway Short Play Festival (commonly referred to as OOB) takes place every summer in New York City. Thousands of playwrights from around the world submit their short plays for consideration, and 30 are chosen to participate. The festival takes place over a week, with four–eight plays being presented per night. Finalists are narrowed down and eventually six are chosen as the winners. Winners are presented with publication and licensing rights and have their show published in a collection of winners from that year. The festival has resulted in the publishing of nearly 200 plays since its inception in 1975 and has launched the careers of many playwrights, including Sheila Callaghan, Theresa Rebeck, and Saviana Stanescu. As of 2019 the festival is in its 44th year.

Samuel French Limited

Samuel French Ltd is the UK sister company of Samuel French Inc. The company publishes stage plays for the UK market, mostly acting editions, serves as licensing agent for performance rights. The theatrical bookshop at Fitzroy Street, London, England, closed in 2017, however it was announced that they would be opening a bookshop inside the Royal Court Theatre in March 2018.

The company was founded when Samuel French and Thomas Hailes Lacy formed a partnership in 1859, combining their existing interests in London and New York City.

References

External links

Samuel French Limited London
Samuel French, Inc.
Breaking Character online magazine
Off-Off-Broadway Short Play Festival

Book publishing companies based in New York (state)
Book publishing companies of the United Kingdom
Bookshops in London
Publishing companies based in New York City
Publishing companies established in 1830
Service companies of the United Kingdom
Theatre in the United Kingdom
1830 establishments in New York (state)
Licensing organizations